Ujjal Biswas is an Indian politician and the present Minister for correctional administration in the Government of West Bengal. He is also an MLA, elected from the Krishnanagar Dakshin constituency in the 2011 West Bengal state assembly election.

References 

State cabinet ministers of West Bengal
Living people
West Bengal MLAs 2011–2016
Trinamool Congress politicians from West Bengal
1954 births
West Bengal MLAs 2016–2021